Medama is a genus of tussock moths in the family Erebidae. The genus was erected by Shōnen Matsumura in 1933.

Species
Medama diplaga (Hampson, 1910)
Medama emeiensis Chao 1980
Medama megerata (Collenette, 1935)
Medama phaea (Hampson, 1900)
Medama spatulidorsum Holloway, 1976

References

Lymantriinae
Moth genera
Taxa named by Shōnen Matsumura